The 2022 African Nations Championship, known as the 2022 CHAN for short and the TotalEnergies African Nations Championship for sponsorship purposes, was the 7th edition of the biennial association football tournament organized by the Confederation of African Football (CAF), featuring national teams consisting of players currently playing in their respective local leagues. It was held in Algeria from 13 January to 4 February 2023.

Originally scheduled from 10 July to 1 August 2022, CAF rescheduled the tournament to January 2023 following an announcement at an executive committee meeting held on 10 September 2020 via video conferencing, citing the postponement of the 2020 edition to 2021 and the 2021 Africa Cup of Nations to 2022 due to the COVID-19 pandemic in Africa as well as the already-scheduled 2022 FIFA World Cup in November – December 2022.

Eighteen teams were supposed to be contesting in this edition, which would have been an increase of 2 teams from the previous edition in 2020; but defending champions Morocco were unable to defend their title due to political tensions with Algerian authorities which began with Algeria's unilaterally decision in 2021 to close its airspace to Moroccan flights, including and especially its official carrier Royal Air Maroc. 

Senegal won their first title, following on from their inaugural Africa Cup of Nations title win a year earlier, 5–4 on penalties against host nation Algeria in the final.

Host selection
Algeria were officially named as hosts of the 2022 edition on 29 September 2018 at an executive committee meeting held on 10 September 2020 at Sharm El Sheikh, Egypt.

Qualification

The qualification procedures were unveiled at the CAF headquarters in Cairo, Egypt on 26 May 2022 with the qualification itself running from 22 July to 4 September 2022.

Qualified teams
The following teams qualified for the main tournament:

Morocco was originally set to take part in the tournament with their under-23 national team after their local national team was officially disbanded by the FRMF on 31 August 2022. However, the team announced their withdrawal from the tournament on 12 January 2023, after hosts Algeria refused to allow the squad to take a direct flight from Rabat to Constantine via their flag carrier sponsor, Royal Air Maroc.

Mascot
Algeria took the fennec fox as a mascot for the championship and named it "COBTAN". And the slogan of the edition was "CHAN fi bled a chène" (CHAN in the country of glory).

Venues
This edition of the tournament was confirmed by the Algerian Football Federation 1 August 2020 to be held in four venues at four cities across host nation Algeria: Algiers, Oran, Constantine and Annaba.

Team base camps

Draw
The draw for this edition was held at Boualem Bessaiah Opera House in the host nation's capital, Algiers, on 1 October 2022 at 18:00 WET (UTC±0).

The 18 teams were drawn into three groups of four teams and two groups of three. Hosts Algeria were seeded in Group A (A1) and defending champions Morocco were seeded in Group C (C1), with the remaining teams were seeded based on their results the four previous editions of the tournament: 2014 (multiplied by 1), 2016 (by 2), 2018 (by 3) and 2020 (by 4):
7 points for winner
5 points for runner-up
3 points for semi-finalists
2 points for quarter-finalists
1 point for group stage

Based on the formula above, the four pots were allocated as follows:

Squads

Each squad can contain a maximum of 28 players (Regulations Article 72).

Match officials
The following 52 match officials officiated during the 2022 African Nations Championship.

Referees

 Lotfi Bekouassa
 Patrice Milazare
 Alhadi Allaou Mahamat
 Kalilou Ibrahim Traoré
 Mohamed Adel
 Abdelaziz Bouh
 Ibrahim Mutaz
 Karim Sabry
 Pierre Ghislain Atcho
 Celso Armindo Alvação
 Samuel Uwikunda
 Vincentia Amédomé
 Mahmood Ali Ismail
 Messie Nkounkou
 Mehrez Melki
 Djindo Louis Hougnandande
 Daouda Gueye
 Tom Abongile
 Blaise Yuven Ngwa
 Emery Niyongabo

Assistant referees

 Akram Abbes Zerhouni
 Sid Ali Brahim El Hamlaoui
 Clemence Kanduku
 Eric Ayimavo Ulrich Ayamr
 Kwasi Brobbey
 Hamedine Diba
 Adou Hermann Desire Ngoh
 Hamza Hagi Abdi
 Modibo Samake
 Dos Reis Abelmiro Montenegro
 Ditsoga Boris Marlaise
 Rodrigue Menye Mpele
 Nouha Bangoura
 Sanou Habib Judicael
 Dieudonne Mutuyimana
 Ivanildo Meirelles De O Sanche Lopes
 Hensley Petrousse
 Abdul Aziz Bollel Jawo

Video assistant referees

 Haythem Guirat
 Lahlou Benbraham
 Daniel Laryea
 Mahmoud Ashor
 Samir Guezzaz
 Dahane Beida
 Issa Sy
 Pacifique Ndabihawenimana
 Bamlak Tessema Weyesa
 Peter Waweru Kamaku
 Zakaria Brinsi
 Mohammed Abdallah Ibrahim

Group stage
The top two teams of each group of 4 and the top team of each group of 3 advanced to the knockout stages.

Group A

Group B

Group C

Group D

Group E

Knockout stage

In the knockout stage, extra time and a penalty shoot-out were used to decide the winners if necessary.

Bracket

Quarter-finals

Semi-finals

Third place play-off

Final

Goalscorers

Awards
The following awards were given at the conclusion of the tournament:

Team of the Tournament

Broadcasting rights
In Africa:

Regional Broadcasters

Broadcasters by country

Rest of the world:

Notes

References

External links
Official home of the 2022 edition at CAFOnline.com

 	

2022 African Nations Championship
2023 in African football
2023 in Algerian sport
21st century in Algiers
January 2023 sports events in Africa
February 2023 sports events in Africa
African Nations Championship
International association football competitions hosted by Algeria
Sports competitions in Algiers
Annaba
Constantine, Algeria
Oran